Yanamax  is a mountain part of the Tian Shan system of mountain ranges in the Xinjiang region of China. Its peak altitude is listed in the American Alpine Club and other sources including Peak Bagger and Google Earth.

The first ascent of Yanamax was completed in August, 2008, by Guy McKinnon and Bruce Normand.

Statistics
 Topographic prominence: Clean: 1702 m/5584 ft, Optimistic: 1702 m/5584 ft
 Topographic isolation: 7.49 km/4.65 mi

Historical maps
Historical English-language maps of the region:

References

External links
 Account of first ascent: "Untapped Potential, Exploring the Chinese Central Tien Shan"
 Mountain Statistics on Peakbagger.com
 On Google Earth

Mountains of Xinjiang